Hale is an unincorporated community in Jones County, Iowa, United States. Hale is north of the Wapsipinicon River, east of Olin, and west of Oxford Junction.

History
Hale was platted in 1876 by J. C. Austin. Hale's population was 76 in 1902.

References

Unincorporated communities in Jones County, Iowa
Unincorporated communities in Iowa